The Ministry of Justice is a ministry of the Government of the Republic of North Macedonia, which is in charge of prosecuting government cases and the administration of institutions falling within the scope of the judiciary system (courts, prisons, etc.).

List of ministers

See also 

 Justice ministry
 Politics of the Republic of Macedonia

External links 

 

Government of North Macedonia
Justice ministries
Government agencies established in 1991
1991 establishments in the Republic of Macedonia